Hristo Zahariev is a Bulgarian professional basketball player who plays for Levski Lukoil.

Honours
Levski Sofia
Balkan League (1): 2013–14
Bulgarian League (1): 2013–14
Bulgarian Cup (1): 2013–14

References

External links 
 Hristo Zahariev at the European U18 Championship

1990 births
Living people
BC Balkan Botevgrad players
BC Levski Sofia players
BC Rilski Sportist players
Bulgarian men's basketball players
Fortitudo Pallacanestro Bologna players
Pallacanestro Trieste players
Pallacanestro Varese players
Shooting guards
Basketball players from Sofia